The Privy Council of the Hawaiian Kingdom, also known as the King's Privy Council of State or Queen's Privy Council of State, was a constitutionally-created body of advisers to the sovereign of the Hawaiian Kingdom from 1845 to 1893. Its members were known as privy councillors and often involved in the other branches of the government.

Overview 
The idea of a body of advisors had its origin in the Council of Chiefs (ʻAha Aliʻi) during the early reign of Kamehameha III and his predecessors. The ʻAha Aliʻi was also the precedent of the House of Nobles in the Legislature of the Hawaiian Kingdom. The first documented meeting on the records of the Privy Council was July 29, 1845, although it may been formed earlier. The Privy Council was officially constituted after the passing of "An Act to Organize the Executive Ministry of the Hawaiian Islands" on October 29, 1845, in the Legislature, which formally outlined the appointment of cabinet ministers for the executive branch and the role of a privy council.

The body was headed by the monarch  or in his absence the Kuhina Nui (premier or vice-monarch). Membership compose of the five (later four) cabinet ministers including the Kuhina Nui and the four island governors, who served as ex-officio members, and other individuals appointed by the monarch to serve at his pleasure. The 1852 Constitution of the Hawaiian Kingdom codified and expanded the role of the body. The role of the Privy Council was to advise and approve all acts made by the monarch such as the declaration of war, granting pardons, convening of the legislature, diplomatic decisions, judicial appointments, gubernatorial appointments, etc.

After the death of Kamehameha IV without an heir on November 30, 1863, Kuhina Nui Victoria Kamāmalu consulted with the Privy Council and proclaimed their brother Prince Lot Kapuāiwa as Kamehameha V. The new king proclaimed the 1864 Constitution which abolished the post of Kuhina Nui, reduced the power of the Privy Council and empowered the position of the monarch. The subsequent constitutions do not mention the ex-officio membership of island governors on the Privy Council.
The Privy Council of State was abolished in 1893 after the overthrow of the Hawaiian Kingdom and the deposition of Queen Liliuokalani. The Provisional Government and Republic of Hawaii replaced it with an Advisory Council and later Council of State.

Historian Ralph Simpson Kuykendall notes: "The privy council became a very important body, numerous powers and duties being assigned to it by the [1845] organic acts" and after 1852 became "a most important feature of the government".

See also 
Cabinet of the Hawaiian Kingdom
Legislature of the Hawaiian Kingdom
Supreme Court of the Hawaiian Kingdom

References

Bibliography

Further reading 

Hawaiian Kingdom
Hawaii law
 
1845 establishments in Hawaii
1893 disestablishments in Hawaii